You Si-kun (born 25 April 1948), also romanized Yu Shyi-kun, is a Taiwanese politician serving as a member and the president of the Legislative Yuan. He was one of the founding members of the Democratic Progressive Party (DPP), and is known to be a strong advocate of Taiwan independence.  He led the DPP as chairman from 2006 to 2007 and served as Premier from 2002 to 2005.

Personal background 
Born in Taihe Village (太和村), Dongshan Township, Yilan County, You was raised in a poor tenant farming family. While he was a 13 year-old student at Taiwan Provincial Yilan High School, his house was destroyed by flood waters during typhoon Pamela and his father died of tuberculosis in the same year. As a result, he quit junior high school to work full-time on his family farm.

At 19, he enrolled in supplementary night school at Lotung Commercial and Vocational High School. He moved to Taipei to enroll in the supplementary Hsihu Commercial and Industrial High School. He studied international commerce at the Chihlee Institute of Technology (致理商專) and public administration at the National Chung Hsing University. He graduated with a Bachelor of Arts in politics in Tunghai University in 1985 at the age of 37.

Rise in politics 
In 1981, he was elected a member of the Taiwan Provincial Assembly for Yilan County. You, Su Tseng-chang, and  made the so-called "iron triangle" in the Assembly. The three were the only members ever to resign from the Assembly.

From 1983 to 1984 he was the Tangwai Secretary-General. He became Convener of Tangwai National Election Backing Committee in 1986. As a founding member of the Democratic Progressive Party, he was a member of its Central Committee from 1984 to 1986 and its Central Standing Committee from 1986 to 1990 when he was elected the Magistrate of Yilan County, during which he was a member of the Educational Reform Committee of the Executive Yuan from 1994 to 1996. In his second term as magistrate, Environmental Protection (環保立縣), Tourism (觀光立縣), Information Promotion (資訊立縣), and Culture (文化立縣) were his four main goals in administration. After the completion of his two terms as magistrate in 1997, he was in 1998 appointed Chairman of the Taipei Rapid Transit Corporation by then Mayor Chen Shui-bian. He resigned in 1999 to become Secretary-General of the Democratic Progressive Party.

He was the chief spokesman for the DPP campaign in the 2000 presidential election. With Chen Shui-bian's election to the presidency, he was appointed Vice Premier under Premier Tang Fei.

In July 2000, four construction workers were trapped by the rising floodwaters of Pachang Creek. As local and central government authorities squabbled for three hours over who would send out a rescue helicopter, the men drowned. In the public outrage that ensued, officials up the chain of command, including Premier Tang, tendered their resignations. Vice Premier You, who was also chairman of the Committee of Disaster Relief and Prevention, had his resignation accepted.

Six months later, You rejoined the administration as Secretary-General to the Office of the President and served until his promotion to the premiership on 1 February 2002.

Premiership 
As premier, You defended the administration's position on the peace referendum and promoted a NT$610.8 billion arms procurement package in 2004. He caused some minor controversy when he used the designation "Taiwan, ROC" on an official visit to Honduras. Chen later said he preferred "Taiwan." In September 2004, he directed the government to refer to the People's Republic of China in official documents as simply "China" as opposed to "mainland China" or "Communist China" as was previously done in order to highlight a "separate Taiwanese identity." This move was not endorsed by the Presidential Office and the Mainland Affairs Council clarified that it would only apply to internal documents.

You and his cabinet resigned en masse following the pan-Green Coalition failure to gain a majority in the 2004 legislative elections. In the ensuing cabinet shuffle, You was returned to the presidential office as secretary-general and succeeded as premier by Frank Hsieh.

On 15 January 2006 he was elected chairman of the Democratic Progressive Party with 54% of the vote.

You was a candidate for the DPP nomination for the 2008 presidential election, competing against Frank Hsieh, Su Tseng-chang, and Annette Lu.  He finished third in the first round of the primary and subsequently withdrew along with the other trailing candidates, paving the way for the leading candidate Hsieh to win the nomination without a need for a second round which would have been based on opinion polling.

Corruption charges and acquittal 
On 21 September 2007, You, along with Vice President Annette Lu and National Security Office secretary-general Mark Chen, were separately indicted on charges of corruption by the Supreme Prosecutor's Office of Taiwan. You was accused of embezzlement and special fund abuse of about US$70,000. He resigned his post as chairperson of the Democratic Progressive Party later that day.  On 2 July 2012, all three were acquitted of all charges.

2014 New Taipei City mayoralty election 
On 29 November 2014, You lost the New Taipei City mayoralty election to his opponent Eric Chu of the Kuomintang.

Later political career 
You was elected to the Legislative Yuan in 2020, securing an at-large seat on behalf of the Democratic Progressive Party. He was elected President of the Legislative Yuan on February 1, 2020, defeating Kuomintang lawmaker Lai Shyh-bao and succeeding Su Jia-chyuan. Speaking at the 2020 Taipei Traditional Chinese Medicine International Forum on July 5, 2020, You Si-kun suggested renaming Chinese medicine as "Taiwanese".

Personal life 
You is the founder of Kavalan Journal (噶瑪蘭雜誌), which is named after the Kavalan Taiwanese aborigines.

He married Yang Pao-yu in 1978, with whom he has two sons. His mother, Huang Shou-chu, died in December 2002.

References 

20th-century Taiwanese politicians
1948 births
Taiwanese political party founders
Living people
Democratic Progressive Party chairpersons
Premiers of the Republic of China on Taiwan
Taiwanese people of Hoklo descent
Tunghai University alumni
Magistrates of Yilan County, Taiwan
Recipients of the Order of Brilliant Star
Heads of government who were later imprisoned
Party List Members of the Legislative Yuan
Members of the 10th Legislative Yuan
Democratic Progressive Party Members of the Legislative Yuan